Eric Hutchison may refer to:

Eric William Hutchison, pilot, see AIR-2 Genie
Eric Hutchison of the Hutchison Baronets

See also
Eric Hutchinson (disambiguation)